Diablo Vista Chorus (DVC) is an amateur women's a cappella singing group, based in the "East Bay" of the San Francisco Bay area. DVC is a chapter of Sweet Adelines International, the world's largest singing organization for women, with over 21,000 members worldwide. DVC primarily performs four-part-harmony works, often in what is traditionally called "barbershop" style.

History 

Founded in 1966, DVC averaged 35–45 members throughout the 1990s and 2000s. As of 2019, the chorus has about 70 members.

DVC is directed by Caitlin Castelino, a member of the 2014 international champion quartet LoveNotes and thus a Queen of Harmony".

Competitions 

The chorus competes each year at the "regional" level of Sweet Adelines. SAI Region 12, Pacific Shores Region, covers northern California, northern Nevada, and southern Oregon. Regional competition is limited to songs in the barbershop style.

International Competition 2019 

At the regional competition in 2018, DVC finished first as a "midsize" chorus (the AA division) and third overall, and they scored high enough to qualify for Sweet Adelines' international competition.

As a result, in September 2019, DVC went to New Orleans for the 73rd SAI convention, and there won the Harmony Classic competition for their division.

Performances 

DVC produces their own shows, at least annually, where the chorus can perform a wider range of styles including pop, show tunes, jazz, and even country. These shows often include guest acts such as a cappella quartets.

The chorus has sung the national anthem at an Oakland A's game annually for several years. Chorus members often sing at local events such as festivals, holiday parties, and senior facilities.

References

External links 

 Diablo Vista Chorus home page
 Diablo Vista Chorus Facebook page
 Sweet Adelines International home page

A cappella musical groups
American vocal groups
Sweet Adelines International
Women's musical groups
Walnut Creek, California
Women in California